Groves Stadium, currently known as Trentini Stadium, is a stadium in Wake Forest, North Carolina, United States.  It hosted the Wake Forest University Demon Deacons football team until the school moved to Winston-Salem, North Carolina and Bowman Gray Stadium.  Since then, the stadium has hosted the homes games of Wake Forest High School.  The stadium held 20,000 people at its peak and was opened in 1940.  It is currently named after former Wake Forest University player and coach of Wake Forest-Rolesville High School, Tony Trentini.  Wake Forest University's current home stadium was also known as Groves Stadium until 2006.

References

Athletics (track and field) venues in North Carolina
Defunct college football venues
Sports venues in North Carolina
Wake Forest Demon Deacons football
High school football venues in the United States
Sports venues in Wake County, North Carolina
1940 establishments in North Carolina
Sports venues completed in 1940
American football venues in North Carolina